The San Antonio Tejanos are a now-defunct baseball team which belonged to the Texas-Louisiana Baseball League, which later became the Central League.  The team lasted for one year, and in 1995 moved to Laredo, Texas, becoming the Laredo Apaches.

External links
San Antonio Express-News Cyber Stylebook
Reporter-News Article Mentioning Jose Cruz

Baseball teams in San Antonio
Defunct minor league baseball teams
Sports clubs disestablished in 1994
Defunct independent baseball league teams
Professional baseball teams in Texas
Defunct baseball teams in Texas
1994 establishments in Texas
1994 disestablishments in Texas
Baseball teams disestablished in 1955
Baseball teams established in 1955